Cheryl J. Misak  is a Canadian philosopher who works in pragmatism, the history of analytic philosophy, and bioethics. She is a University Professor at the University of Toronto, a Fellow of the Royal Society of Canada, and a recipient of a Guggenheim Fellowship in intellectual and cultural history. In 2011, Misak served as president of the Charles S. Peirce Society. In December 2020, Misak became the interim director of the Munk School of Global Affairs at the University of Toronto.

Misak was raised in Lethbridge, Alberta. She received her BA from the University of Lethbridge, her MA from Columbia University, and her DPhil from the University of Oxford.

Publications

References

External links 
 
 

Alumni of the University of Oxford
Canadian historians of philosophy
Fellows of the Royal Society of Canada
Academic staff of the University of Lethbridge
Columbia University alumni
Academic staff of the University of Toronto
Bioethicists
Writers from Lethbridge
Living people
Year of birth missing (living people)